Shetkaryaca Asud is a book written by Jyotirao Phule about terrible situation of the cultivators in 19th century. It was written in Marathi language and got published in 1881.

The book gives a few of the numerous reasons connected with the religion and politics that had put the Shudra farmers in such a pitiable condition. It argues that a tyrannical religion, the dominance of Brahmin employees in government departments and the luxury-loving indolence of British administrators meant that the Shudra farmers were tormented and deceived.

References

Works about farmers
Marathi-language literature